Magane En Marumagane is a 2010 Indian Tamil-language comedy drama film written and directed by T. P. Gajendran. The film stars Vivek, Mithun, and Yamini Sharma, while Thenmozhi, Nassar, Saranya, Livingston, and Thambi Ramaiah play supporting roles. The music was composed by Dhina with cinematography by Raja Rajan and editing by Ganesh. The film was launched on 14 July 2008 and released on 21 May 2010.

Plot 
The "Jameendar" of a village on the foothills of Palani temple is living happily with his wife. The couple is liberal and spends all their money on the villagers. Enter Singapetti Singaram, a con, and his grandmother.

Singaram cons the Jameendar and marries his daughter Ponnarasi, whose brother Raghu, an IT professional and city slicker, is fiercely opposed to it. Singaram wastes his money in gambling and is defeated by his enemy. His enemy is killed, and Singaram is framed up in a murder case which he did not commit. He is then forced to leave the village. He comes to Chennai and turns a new leaf and overnight becomes a real estate tycoon.

Meanwhile, Raghu, the bad brother, urged by his evil uncle, ditches his parents, who are left penniless on the street. When Singaram comes to the village and sees that the family became poor, Raghu learns that his uncle cheated his parents, and he is affected by heart disease. In the hospital, Raghu's mother gave up her life to donate heart transplant to save his son. The film ends with Raghu marrying Thenmozhi.

Cast 
 Vivek as Singapetti Singaram
 Mithun as Raghu
 Yamini Sharma as Ponnarasi
 Thenmozhi as Thenmozhi
 Paravai Muniyamma as Singaram's grandmother
 Nassar as Jameendar
 Saranya as Jameendar's wife
 Livingston as Mahadevan, Raghu's uncle
 Thambi Ramaiah as Singaram's sidekick
 Meenal
 Lollu Sabha Manohar as Singaram's sidekick
 T. P. Gajendran as a priest
 Prabhu in a guest appearance
 Shreekumar in a guest appearance

Production
The producers and director requested Kamal Haasan to appear in a guest role to promote organ donation, though the actor eventually did not feature.

Soundtrack
The soundtrack is composed by Dhina. "Poda Vengayam" is remixed from the famous Rajini song "Raman Aandalum" from Mullum Malarum. Celebrities who participated in the audio release event included Vivek and Nassar, who had both acted in the movie; directors T. P. Gajendran and K. S. Ravikumar; actors Dhanush and Bharath; actress Namitha; and others.

Critical reception
Behindwoods wrote "All said and done Magane En Marumagane is a family movie and given the huge success of tearjerker sitcoms in primetime television, it stands a chance to exert its pull over women and rural audiences in particular." Sify wrote "Magane En Marumagane, is not a fun movie. It is pure mush and melodrama, and looks like director TP Gajendran has etched the story from the 60?s and 70?s family glycerine tearjerkers". Kollywood Today wrote "Magane En Marumagane is one such film that annoys you badly putting you restless all throughout the film. The very basic presentation of this film itself looks like a village affected with plague as every character on the screen looks like dullards".

References

External links
 

2010 films
Indian drama films
2010s Tamil-language films
Films directed by T. P. Gajendran